The men's 60 metres hurdles event at the 2003 IAAF World Indoor Championships was held on March 15–16.

Medalists

Results

Heats
First 3 of each heat (Q) and next 4 fastest (q) qualified for the semifinals.

Semifinals
First 4 of each semifinal qualified (Q) directly for the final.

Final

References
Results

60
60 metres hurdles at the World Athletics Indoor Championships